The 2023 San Antonio mayoral election will be held on May 6, 2023, to elect the mayor of San Antonio, Texas. Incumbent mayor Ron Nirenberg is running for re-election to a fourth term in office. Due to term limits, if Nirenberg wins, it will be his last term. He is facing minimal opposition and is expected to win re-election.

Candidates

Declared
Ray Basaldua, small business owner and candidate for mayor in 2021
Armando Dominguez
Michael Idrogo, perennial candidate
Christopher Longoria, independent filmmaker
Ron Nirenberg, incumbent mayor
Michael Samaniego
Christopher Schuchardt
Diana Uriegas

Results

References

2023 Texas elections
San Antonio
Mayoral elections in San Antonio
Non-partisan elections